Trinodinae is a subfamily of beetles in the family Dermestidae, containing the following genera:

 Apsectus LeConte, 1854
 Evorinea Beal, 1961
 Hexanodes Blair, 1941
 Thylodrias Motschulsky, 1839
 Trichelodes Carter, 1935
 Trichodryas Lawrence & Slipinski, 2005
 Trinodes Dejean, 1821
 Trinoparvus Háva, 2004

References

External links
Trinodinae at ITIS

Dermestidae
Taxa named by Thomas Lincoln Casey Jr.